The year 1654 in music involved some significant events.

Events 
April 21 – Francisco Lopez Capillas becomes chapelmaster of Mexico City Cathedral.
Georg Caspar Wecker becomes organist of the Frauenkirche in Nuremberg.
The newly formed Innsbruck opera company open's with Antonio Cesti's Cleopatra
Violin maker Giuseppe Giovanni Battista Guarneri opens a workshop in Cremona.

Publications 
Jacob van Eyck – Der Fluyten Lust-hof (4th edition)

Classical music 
Louis Couperin – Fugue Grave sur Urbs Beata Jherusalem

Opera 
Antonio Maria Abbatini – Del male in bene
Francesco Cavalli
 Ciro 
Xerse, January 12 at the Teatro SS Giovanni e Paolo in Venice
Antonio Cesti – Cleopatra, with libretto by Dario Varotari the Younger, Innsbruck, date unknown.
Francesco Provenzale – Teseo

Births 
February 3 – Pietro Antonio Fiocco, composer (died 1714)
July 25 – Agostino Steffani, churchman, diplomat and composer (died 1728)
September – Vincent Lübeck, organist and composer (died 1740)
October 23 – Johann Bernhard Staudt, composer (died 1712)
date unknown 
Étienne Loulié, French musician, teacher and music theorist (died 1702)
Count Ludovico Roncalli, composer for guitar (died 1713)
probable – Servaes de Koninck, composer (died c.1701)

Deaths 
February 19 – Edmund Chilmead, writer, translator and musician (born 1610)
March 24 – Samuel Scheidt, organist and composer (born 1587)
date unknown – Francisco Correa de Arauxo, organist and composer (born 1584)
probable – Julius Ernst Rautenstein, composer (born c.1590)

References 

 
17th century in music
Music by year